The Philippine Presidential Unit citation Badge is a unit decoration of the Republic of the Philippines. It has been awarded to certain units of the United States military and the Philippine Commonwealth military for actions both during and subsequent to the Second World War.

Appearance and wear
No U.S. ribbon devices are authorized for wear with this award.

Smaller version
Foreign military unit members who are authorized to wear this unit award, either wear the award on the right side of the uniform (e.g., United States Army) with any other same size unit award emblems or wear the slightly smaller size version of the award on the left side of the uniform (e.g., United States Navy, United States Marine Corps, United States Coast Guard, United States Air Force) with their other service ribbons.

History 
The Philippine Republic Presidential Unit Citation Badge (PRPUCB) was established by Headquarters, Philippine National Defense Forces, on September 14, 1946, to be award for extraordinary meritorious service during World War II. The award is made in the name of the President of the Republic of the Philippines.

World War II 
All U.S. military units and naval vessels that earned any of the Philippine service stars and certain submarines which maintained physical contact with the newly established armed forces of the Commonwealth of the Philippines and local recognized guerrilla forces during the Japanese occupation of the Philippine Islands during World War II are entitled to the award:

 For service in defense of the Philippines from December 7, 1941, to May 10, 1942
 For service in the liberation of the Philippines from October 17, 1944, to July 4, 1945

Disaster relief operations 
The Philippine Presidential Unit Citation for disaster relief operations was bestowed on:
 The Philippine military and the U.S. Navy Disaster Task Force (September 1 to December 14, 1970) and Navy and Marine Corps Units of Joint U.S. Military Advisory Group, Philippines Amphibious Ready Group Alpha (October 21–26, 1970) for relief efforts during several natural disasters which occurred in the Philippines during August 1 to December 15, 1970 (a series of typhoons) and from July 21 to August 15, 1972 (monsoon rains and associated floods).
 The U.S. Naval Hospital, Subic Bay for the period of August 1, 1987, to November 30, 1991, and
 The guided-missile cruiser  for the period of May 1989 to June 1999.
 Joint Task Force 510 and Joint Special Operations Task Force-Philippines in February 2005, by President Gloria Macapagal Arroyo to members of the two units serving between 31 January 2002 and 31 July 2002 in support of RP-US Exercise Balikatan 02–1 in Southern Mindanao.  JTF-510/JSOTF-Philippines aimed at reducing the threats of terrorism and provided assistance with training, socio-economic activities and civil engineering projects, particularly in Basilan and Zamboanga City (Ref: RP General Order No. 146, dated 2 Feb 05, Subj:  Award of the Philippine Republic Presidential Unit citation Badge).

See also
 Awards and decorations of the Armed Forces of the Philippines
 Presidential Unit Citation (United States)
 Presidential Unit Citation (Vietnam)
 Republic of Korea Presidential Unit Citation

References
Citations

Bibliography
 The AFP Adjutant General, Awards and Decorations Handbook, 1995, 1997, 2014, OTAG.
 Decorations and Medals of the Philippines
 Navy and Marine Corps Awards Manual
 Secretary of the Navy Instruction for awards
Institute of Heraldry Philippine Presidential Unit Citation

Military awards and decorations of the Philippines
 
Campaign medals